Balasore Law College commonly known as BLC is a private law institute situated at O.T Road, Balia in Balasore of Balasore district in the Indian state of Odisha. It offers 3 years and 5 years integrated B.A, LL.B. courses approved by the Bar Council of India (BCI) and it is affiliated to Fakir Mohan University.

History
Balasore Law College is the first private law institute under Utkal University and second in the state of Odisha. The institute was established in 1978 under the affiliation of Utkal University. After the establishment of Fakir Mohan University in 1999, it became permanently affiliated to Fakir Mohan University.

References

Educational institutions established in 1978
1978 establishments in Orissa
Law schools in Odisha
Affiliated Colleges to Fakir Mohan University